Drassyllus insularis is a species of ground spider in the family Gnaphosidae. It is found in North America.

References

External links

 

Gnaphosidae
Articles created by Qbugbot
Spiders described in 1900